Benjamin Lax (29 December 1915, Miskolc, Hungary – 21 April 2015, Newton, Massachusetts) was a solid-state and plasma physicist.

Biography
Benjamin Lax immigrated in 1926 with his family to the United States. After secondary education at Brooklyn's Boys High School, he received in 1941 his bachelor's degree in mechanical engineering from Cooper Union. After being drafted into the US Army in 1942, he was assigned to MIT's Radiation Laboratory to work on the development of radar. He received in 1949 from MIT his Ph.D. under Sanborn C. Brown with thesis The effect of magnetic field on the breakdown of gases at high frequencies.

Lax joined in 1951 MIT's Lincoln Laboratory, where he did research on semiconductors by studying their energy band structure using cyclotron resonance. These pioneering studies of germanium and silicon played an essential role in the development of semiconductor devices. Lax was a co-inventor on an early patent for semiconductor lasers. He became in 1958 Head of the Solid-State Division and in 1964 Associate Director of the Laboratory. From 1960 to 1981 he was the director of the Francis Bitter National Magnet Laboratory. From 1964 until his retirement in 1986 he was a physics professor at MIT.

In 1960, he was awarded the Oliver E. Buckley Condensed Matter Prize for "his fundamental contributions in microwave and infrared spectroscopy of semiconductors.” At MIT he supervised the doctoral dissertations of 36 students. He was the co-author, with Kenneth J. Button, of the 1962 book “Microwave Ferrites and Ferrimagnetics”. He was elected in 1962 to the American Academy of Arts and Sciences and in 1969 to the National Academy of Sciences in 1969. He was also elected in 1957 a Fellow of the American Physical Society and in 1981 a Fellow of the American Association for the Advancement of Science. He was a Guggenheim Fellow for the academic year 1981–1982. In 2009 he was inducted into The Cooper Union Hall of Fame.

He was predeceased by his wife, Blossom Cohen Lax. Upon his death, he was survived by two sons and a granddaughter.

References

American physicists
1915 births
2015 deaths
Cooper Union alumni
Massachusetts Institute of Technology alumni
Massachusetts Institute of Technology School of Science faculty
Members of the United States National Academy of Sciences
Fellows of the American Physical Society
Fellows of the American Association for the Advancement of Science
MIT Lincoln Laboratory people
Boys High School (Brooklyn) alumni
Scientists from New York (state)
Oliver E. Buckley Condensed Matter Prize winners
American plasma physicists
Hungarian emigrants to the United Kingdom